Philipp Petzschner and Tim Pütz were the defending champions, but Petzschner chose not to participate this year. Pütz played alongside Jan-Lennard Struff, but lost in the first round to John Peers and Bruno Soares.

Peers and Soares went on to win the title, defeating Rohan Bopanna and Denis Shapovalov in the final, 7–5, 6–3.

Seeds

Draw

Draw

References
 Main Draw

MercedesCup - Doubles
Doubles 2019